Jason Love is a standup comedian from Thousand Oaks, California. Love began his career in 2003 by syndicating Snapshots, a daily cartoon published by newspapers such as The Denver Post and Tampa Bay Times. From 2003 to 2007, Love worked as a humor columnist for the Ventura County Star.

From 2008 to present, Jason Love has worked as a standup comedian, performing more than 200 times per year for comedy clubs, corporations, and cruise ships. Such as Royal Caribbean, Holland America, Norwegian, and Carnival.

Jason Love has since worked full-time as a standup comedian, performing for comedy clubs, corporations, cruise ships, and private parties.

Jason runs a non-profit, Love & Laughter, that brings free standup comedy shows to cancer support locations across the country.

In 2017 he recorded a Dry Bar Comedy special called Jokes On Me.

His second special, Professional Moron, was produced by 800 Pound Gorilla and airs daily on Pandora and Sirius XM.

Since COVID-19, Jason has produced a popular virtual show, Live Comedy in Your Living Room, which features professional comics performing live from around the country.

Jason is represented by Levity Entertainment Group.

Standup comedy
Known for his “clean style and quirky spirit", Jason Love headlines at comedy clubs and cruise ships while producing his own shows at venues such as the San Diego County Fair and performing arts centers.  The VC Reporter describes Jason as a "lean, clean, jokin’ machine."

Television
HBO (played a horse race expert on HBO’s “Luck” with Dustin Hoffman)
Last Comic Standing (NBC)
Laughs on Fox.
Today's Riff on TBS 
Standup and Deliver on Nuvo TV 
One-hour special for Dry Bar Comedy.
Host of the video series “Canned” produced by Studio 805.
Hosted for the Ventura County Star a number of humorous videos produced by Anthony Plascencia.

Radio

 Love has appeared on The Bob & Tom Show radio program.
 Podcast Labor of Love produced by Sideshow Network.
 Sirius XM channel Laughs USA.

Cruise lines
Royal Caribbean
Celebrity
Norwegian
Carnival
Holland America
Princess

Casinos and Clubs

Brad Garrett's
Improv 
Laugh Factory
Stardome
Caroline's on Broadway
Flappers
Punchline
Zanies
Edgewater
Comedy Store
Balboa Theatre
Hermosa Comedy & Magic
Standup Live
Parlor Live

Internet
Podcast, Labor of Love 
Livestream series Jason Love & Friends 
Pandora Radio

Armed Forces Entertainment
Jason Love performed in Afghanistan for the troops.

Discography
Metro Man 

Jokes On Me

Publications
Snapshots: The Big Picture 

So It Goes: Stories for People Who Laugh 

Quotes from Jason Love's standup act can be found in Reader's Digest  as well as the books Comedy Thesaurus and Squeaky Clean Comedy.

Awards
2006: Second Place in Humor for circulations over 100K from The National Society of Newspaper Columnists.

Love was a finalist at the Cabo Comedy Festival and at the World Series of Comedy in Vegas.

References

External links

 Jason Love's YouTube Channel
 IMDb: Jason Love Biography
 Ventura County Star Newspaper
 Labor of Love Podcast
 Gigmasters.com entry

Musicians from California
People from Thousand Oaks, California
Living people
American male writers
Comedians from California
21st-century American comedians
Year of birth missing (living people)